Simon Marsh is a footballer.

Simon Marsh may also refer to:

Simon Marsh (MP)
Simon Marsh, executive producer of Celebrity Super Spa